The 1975 Hawaii earthquake occurred on November 29 with a moment magnitude of 7.7 and a maximum Mercalli intensity of VIII (Severe). The shock affected several of the Hawaiian Islands and resulted in the deaths of two people and up to 28 injured. Significant damage occurred in the southern part of the Big Island totalling $4–4.1 million, and it also triggered a small brief eruption of Kilauea volcano.

The source of the event was the Hilina Slump, which was also responsible for the more powerful 1868 Hawaii earthquake and tsunami.

See also
List of earthquakes in 1975
List of earthquakes in Hawaii
List of earthquakes in the United States

References

External links
USGS Hawaiian Volcano Observatory
Tsunami Animation: Hawaii 1975 – Pacific Tsunami Warning Center

1975 earthquakes
Earthquakes in Hawaii
Geography of Hawaii (island)
1975 tsunamis
Hawaii earthquake
Volcanic earthquakes